Plastin-2 is a protein that in humans is encoded by the LCP1 gene.

Function 

Plastins are a family of actin-binding proteins that are conserved throughout eukaryote evolution and expressed in most tissues of higher eukaryotes. In humans, two ubiquitous plastin isoforms (L and T) have been identified. Plastin 1 (otherwise known as fimbrin) is a third distinct plastin isoform which is specifically expressed at high levels in the small intestine. The L isoform is expressed only in hemopoietic cell lineages, while the T isoform has been found in all other normal cells of solid tissues that have replicative potential (fibroblasts, endothelial cells, epithelial cells, melanocytes, etc.). However, L-plastin has been found in many types of malignant human cells of non-hemopoietic origin suggesting that its expression is induced accompanying tumorigenesis in solid tissues.

References

Further reading 

 
 
 
 
 
 
 
 
 
 
 
 
 
 
 
 
 
 
 

EF-hand-containing proteins